Mary Hutchinson may refer to:

Marybeth Hutchinson, character in The Faculty

Mary Hutchinson Women's Prison
Mary Carroll (netball) née Hutchinson, netball player
Mary Hutchinson, wife of poet William Wordsworth
Mary Hutchinson (writer)
Mary E. Hutchinson (1906–1970), American artist and art instructor